Operation Kıran was a military operation in Turkey, conducted by Turkish security forces, including police, gendarmerie and village guards. The operation started at 17 August 2019 and was under the command of the Ministry of Interior. Reportedly 600 PKK militants are currently inside Turkish borders. The aim of the operation was to decrease PKK presence in rural areas in southeastern Turkey.

Operation timeline

Operation Kıran-1

17 August 2019 
Phase 1 was launched in three provinces including Hakkari, Şırnak and Van. In total 43 caves and shelters belonging to PKK was destroyed.

Operation Kıran-2

28 August 2019 
Phase 2 was launched in three provinces.

Operation Kıran-3

21 September 2019 
Phase 3 was launched in two provinces including Siirt and Şırnak with 2,325 security personnels. Reportedly 16 PKK members, including 2 in Turkey's wanted list, were killed, wounded or captured. 6 shelters belonging to PKK were destroyed and 4 IEDs were defused.

Operation Kıran-4

Operation Kıran-5

8 November 2019 
Phase 5 was launched in three provinces including Diyarbakır, Muş and Bingöl with 3,000 security personnels.

9 November 2019 
PKK's Ağrı responsible Halis Ersayan, who was sought on Turkey's grey list with a reward of 300,000 Turkish liras ($53,000) has been killed.

Operation Kıran-6

13 November 2019 
Phase 3 was launched in three provinces including Hakkari, Şırnak and Van with 2,360 security personnels. 1 RPG-7, 1 sniper rifle, 14 hand grenades, 34 ATGM ammunition, 18 kg TNT were seized by Turkish security forces, while 4 IEDs were defused as well.

15 November 2019 
5 ton marijuana was seized by the police. Reportedly 2 IEDs were defused as well.

Operation Kıran-7

23 November 2019 
Phase 7 was launched in Tunceli Province with 2,250 security personnels.

References

Kurdish–Turkish conflict (2015–present)
2019 military operations
2019 in Turkey